Poker Face Paul is a series of four video games for Game Gear that simulates various card games, all released in 1994.  The individual games are Poker Face Paul's Blackjack, Poker Face Paul's Gin, Poker Face Paul's Poker, and Poker Face Paul's Solitaire.

Development 
Blackjack and Solitaire were developed by Spidersoft, with both games taking twenty-five days each to be completed.

Reception
In their July 1994 issue GamePro reviewed all of the Poker Face Paul games except Gin. They gave Poker a mostly negative review and outright panned both Blackjack and Solitaire, remarking that all three games suffer from poor graphics and sounds, and that aside from Poker they offer less fun than can be had by playing the game with a real deck of cards, which also cost far less than a Game Gear cartridge.

References

External links
 Poker Face Paul's Blackjack at GameFAQs
 Poker Face Paul's Poker at GameFAQs
 Poker Face Paul's Gin at GameFAQs
 Poker Face Paul's Solitaire at GameFAQs
 Poker Face Paul's Gin at MobyGames
 Poker Face Paul's Poker at MobyGames

1994 video games
Casino video games
Game Gear games
Game Gear-only games
North America-exclusive video games
Poker video games
Multiplayer and single-player video games
Video games scored by Mark Cooksey
Video games developed in the United Kingdom
Video games developed in the United States